ULEB Cup 2007–08 Knockout Stage are the main rounds of ULEB Cup 2007-08, included Sixteenth Finals and Eighthfinals.

Draw Seeds

Elimination rounds

Sixteenth Finals
The draw to determine a bracket for the elimination rounds of the 2007-08 ULEB Cup was held on Monday, January 28, 2008, at 13:30 CET in the Museu Olimpic i de l'Esport in Barcelona.

First Leg
February 19, 2008

Second Leg
February 26–27, 2008

Points difference

Eighthfinals
The winners from Sixteenth-finals advance to Eighthfinals.

First Leg
March 11, 2008

Second Leg
March 18–19, 2008

Points difference

Final Eight

The Final Eight of ULEB Cup 2007-08 will be played in Turin, Italy. The matches will played from April 10 to April 13. There are quarter-finals, semi-finals and final. The Torino Palavela will hosted the Final Eight.

Bracket

References

External links
ULEB Cup

2007–08 ULEB Cup